Stan Whitty (birth unknown – death unknown) was an English professional rugby league footballer who played in the 1910s, 1920s  and 1930s.

Playing career

International honours
Stan Whitty was selected for Great Britain while at Hull for the 1924 Great Britain Lions tour of Australia and New Zealand, he did not play in any of the test matches on this tour, but played in 14-tour matches, and scored 5-Tries.

Club career
Stan Whitty made his début for Hull FC on Saturday 27 December 1919, and he played his last game for Hull FC on Saturday 25 April 1931.

References

External links
!Great Britain Statistics at englandrl.co.uk (statistics currently missing due to not having appeared for both Great Britain, and England)
 (archived by web.archive.org) Stats → PastPlayers → W at hullfc.com
 (archived by web.archive.org) Statistics at hullfc.com
The Singapore Free Press and Mercantile Advertiser (1884-1942), 14 April 1924, Page 12

English rugby league players
Great Britain national rugby league team players
Hull F.C. players
Place of birth missing
Place of death missing
Rugby league halfbacks
Year of birth missing
Year of death missing
Yorkshire rugby league team players